Below is a list of Missouri state high school boys basketball championships as determined by the championship tournament sponsored by the University of Missouri in Columbia, Missouri, held from 1917 through 1926.

Early Championships

Below is a list of Missouri state high school boys basketball championships sanctioned by the Missouri State High School Activities Association since the organization began holding the tournaments in 1927.

Championships

Number of titles won by school

See also
 Mr. Show-Me Basketball
 Miss Show-Me Basketball
 List of Missouri state high school girls basketball championships
 List of Missouri state high school girls volleyball championships
 List of Missouri state high school baseball champions
 List of Missouri state high school football champions
 List of Missouri high schools by athletic conferences

References

Cham
high school basketball
High school basketball competitions in the United States